The Plumb Memorial Library is a public library in Shelton, Connecticut.  It is located at 65 Wooster St., in an architecturally distinguished Richardsonian Romanesque building designed by Bridgeport architect Charles T. Beardsley, Jr. and built in 1895.  It was listed on the National Register of Historic Places in 1978.  The building is named in memory of David Wells Plumb, a local businessman and philanthropist, whose widow donated land for its construction.  A modern addition was added in 1975, significantly enlarging the library's space and look.

See also
National Register of Historic Places listings in Fairfield County, Connecticut

References

Library buildings completed in 1895
National Register of Historic Places in Fairfield County, Connecticut
Libraries in Fairfield County, Connecticut
Buildings and structures in Shelton, Connecticut